Don Sickler (January 6, 1944) is an American jazz trumpeter, arranger and producer.

In the 1980s, he set up a tribute band called Dameronia with Philly Joe Jones, to play the music of Tadd Dameron.

He also worked extensively with Joe Henderson, a collaboration leading to four Grammy awards.

Discography

As leader
 The Music of Kenny Dorham (Reservoir, 1983)
 Night Watch (Uptown, 1995)
 Reflections (HighNote, 2002)

With Dameronia
To Tadd with Love (Uptown, 1982) with Philly Joe Jones
Look Stop Listen (Uptown, 1983) with Philly Joe Jones
Live at the Theatre Boulogne (Soul Note, 1989)

As sideman
With Superblue
 Superblue (Blue Note, 1988)
 Superblue II (Blue Note)
With Larry Coryell
 Inner Urge (HighNote, 2001)
With Meredith D'Ambrosio
Wishing on the Moon (Sunnyside, 2004 [2006])
With Clifford Jordan
Play What You Feel (Mapleshade, 1990 [1997])
Down Through the Years (Milestone, 1991)
With T. S. Monk
Take One (Blue Note, 1992)
Changing of the Guard (Blue Note, 1993)
The Charm (Blue Note, 1995)
Monk on Monk (N2K, 1997)
With Freddie Redd
Lonely City (Uptown, 1985 [1989]) - trumpet and arranger
With Claudio Roditi
Claudio! (Uptown, 1985) - as arranger
With Charlie Rouse
 Social Call (Uptown, 1984) and Red Rodney - as arranger
 Soul Mates (Uptown, 1988 [1993]) featuring Sahib Shihab - as arranger
With Jack Sheldon
Playing for Change (Uptown, 1986 [1997]) - flugelhorn and arranger
With James Spaulding
Blues Nexus (Muse, 1993) - flugelhorn on 1 track
Escapade (HighNote, 1999)
With Buddy Tate and Al Grey
Just Jazz (Uptown, 1984) - as arranger
With Joe Thomas and Jay McShann
Blowin' in from K.C. (Uptown, 1983) - as arranger
With Jack Walrath
Gut Feelings (Muse, 1990 [1992]) as conductor
With Cedar Walton
 Cedar Walton Plays (Delos, 1986)
 Roots (Astor Place, 1997)
With Frank Wess and Johnny Coles
Two at the Top (Uptown, 1983) - as arranger

References 

American jazz composers
American male jazz composers
American jazz trumpeters
American male trumpeters
American male songwriters
Living people
21st-century trumpeters
20th-century trumpeters
20th-century American composers
21st-century American composers
20th-century American male musicians
21st-century American male musicians
Year of birth missing (living people)
Dameronia members
Statesmen of Jazz members
Superblue (band) members
Reservoir Records artists
HighNote Records artists
Uptown Records (jazz) artists
20th-century jazz composers
21st-century jazz composers